The Zhestianaya Gorka massacre was a World War II massacre of partisans and civilians, mostly women and children, carried out in the village of Zhestianaya Gorka (now Novgorod oblast, Russia) by Schutzmannschaft and Nazi collaborators.

Massacre 
The massacre was not an unusual incident in the Soviet Union during World War II. In 1942—1944 German occupiers and their Russian and Latvian collaborators killed at least 2600 people in Zhestianaya Gorka. Russian historian Boris Kovalyov proved that a concentration camp was built near Zhestianaya Gorka.

Post-war trials 
German general Kurt Herzog and 18 his troops were tried in Novgorod in 1947. They were received prison for 25 years. Kurt Herzog died in 1948 at a prison, another inmates were released in 1954.

References

Massacres in 1942 
Massacres in 1943 
Massacres in 1944 
1942 in the Soviet Union
1943 in the Soviet Union
1944 in the Soviet Union
Nazi war crimes in the Soviet Union
Eastern Front (World War II)
Nazi war crimes in Russia
Massacres in the Soviet Union
1942 murders in the Soviet Union
1943 murders in the Soviet Union
1944 murders in the Soviet Union